Many places, predominantly in France, have been named after French Resistance leader and hero Pierre Brossolette.

Summary 
More than 600 public places can be accounted for bearing the name of Pierre Brossolette, a top leader and hero of French Resistance, making it one of the top-20 most-featured all-time public names in France.  Most of them were inaugurated before 1964, in which period he was actually considered the most influential leader and the greatest hero of the wartime period. Accessorily, street inaugurations were systematically made, before Jean Moulin's Panthéon enthronement in 1964, according to the official government "tripartite" chart: Henri Honoré d'Estienne d'Orves (representing royalists and by extension the right-wing), Pierre Brossolette (socialists) and Gabriel Péri (communists).

Among these places, most are streets/squares distributed all over France, including overseas counties like La Réunion. 
The total count nears 500 (at least 490 actually) streets ranging from boulevards to cul-de-sacs, squares and greens, quays and bridges.

Also at least 76 schools, 27 venues (stadia, gyms, community centers), 8 estates/projects and 23 condominia can be counted, adding up to a minimum count of 624 places (not including building and street plaques, steles and monuments).

Streets and squares

By county
As of 2010, France counts 36 683 counties averaging an area of 14.88 km².

Among top 500 counties in France
The top 500 populated counties account for a population of 26.5M (40% of the overall French population).

 Street/square count: 211
 County count: 199
 Population coverage: 52% (13.6M inhabitants)

In a nutshell, 1 out of 2 Frenchmen residing in a top 500 county will have that county featuring a street/square Pierre-Brossolette.

Remaining featured French counties

 Street/square count: 282
 County count: 272

By region/province
 Île-de-France's #1 Paris metropolitan area alone accounts for 127 counties featuring streets/squares Pierre-Brossolette.

Walloon county
 Seraing,  province of Liège, Belgium — Place (Square) Pierre-Brossolette

Totals
 Street/square count: 490

Obs.: at least 4 streets are double-counted as they border two counties: Montrouge (rank 128) / Malakoff (249), Draveil (284) / Vigneux-sur-seine (305), Villeneuve-le-Roi (503) / Ablon-sur-Seine (2 000), Pierrefitte-Nestalas (7 743) / Soulom (24 935). The count above is rectified accordingly.

 County count: 472
 Urban Area count: 148 out of 771 continental (19%) and 1 out of 21 overseas, totaling 149 out of 792 (18%)
 Département count: 81 out of 95 (continental) and 1 out of 5 (overseas), totaling 82 out of 100.

 Region count: 22 (all French regions except non-mainland Corsica, Martinique, Guadeloupe, Guyane and Mayotte)
 Population coverage: 24% (15.8M) of the overall French population (66.1M).

Schools 

Count: 76

Sports, leisure and cultural venues

Count: 27

Housing estates/projects
Cité Brossolette

Count: 8

Retirement/private condominia
Résidence Brossolette

Count: 23

Buildings with memorial plaques

Memorial steles
Saint-Saëns, Seine-Maritime (76), Normandie
Plogoff, Finistère (29), Bretagne

Harbor
Port Brossolette

Location: Narbonne-Plage, Narbonne County, Aude (10), Languedoc-Roussillon

The harbor features the:

Monument Pierre Brossolette Memorial
A unique aeolian memorial where 4 wind pipes would play the 4 chords of Beethoven's 5th symphony, in a reference to the BBC's Radio Londres opening. The pipes have been muted as the desert beach developed postwar into a balneary. The pipes have actually been stolen recently.

Port Brossolette Lighthouse
Modern-styled concrete lighthouse

Lists of places named after people